The 1952 United States presidential election in Nevada took place on November 4, 1952, as part of the 1952 United States presidential election. State voters chose three representatives, or electors, to the Electoral College, who voted for president and vice president.

Nevada was won by Columbia University President Dwight D. Eisenhower (R–New York), running with Senator Richard Nixon, with 61.45% of the popular vote, against Adlai Stevenson (D–Illinois), running with Senator John Sparkman, with 38.55% of the popular vote. This was the last time that Clark County did not cast the most votes of any county in a presidential election in Nevada.

Results

Results by county

See also
United States presidential elections in Nevada

References

Nevada
1952
1952 Nevada elections